Milford Township, Ohio may refer to several places:

Milford Township, Butler County, Ohio
Milford Township, Defiance County, Ohio
Milford Township, Knox County, Ohio

Ohio township disambiguation pages